The Hector Hodler Library is one of the largest Esperanto libraries, with approximately 30,000 books in addition to periodicals, manuscripts, photos, music, and other collections.  It occupies three rooms in the central office of the Universal Esperanto Association (UEA) in Rotterdam, Netherlands.

The Swiss Esperanto Society opened the library in Switzerland in 1908.  In 1912, the library came into the possession of Hector Hodler, the founder of UEA, and after Hodler's death in 1920 the library remained under the management of UEA in Switzerland. In 1947, the library was renamed the Hector Hodler Library, and when UEA headquarters relocated to Rotterdam, the library was moved there in 1960.

Other major collections of Esperanto books are at the International Esperanto Museum, the Montagu C. Butler Library, the Center for Documentation and Study about the International Language in Switzerland, and the German Esperanto Library.

See also 

 List of libraries in the Netherlands

References

External links 

 About the library

Libraries in the Netherlands
Esperanto libraries
Buildings and structures in Rotterdam
Education in South Holland
Esperanto in the Netherlands